Renato Cellini (April 24, 1912 – March 25, 1967) was an Italian opera conductor.  His father was Ezio Cellini, who was a stage director who worked with Arturo Toscanini.

Metropolitan Opera 

Cellini went to the United States in 1947, when he joined the staff of the Metropolitan Opera,  and where he debuted conducting Don Carlos, on April 9, 1952, with Jussi Björling, Eleanor Steber and Regina Resnik in the cast.  The following year, he led Aïda (with Herva Nelli and Jean Madeira) and La forza del destino (with Zinka Milanov and Mario del Monaco).  In 1954, he conducted La forza again (now with Nelli and Leonard Warren), and a double-bill of Cavalleria rusticana and Pagliacci.

His 1950 recording of Rigoletto, with Jan Peerce, Warren, Italo Tajo, Erna Berger, and Nan Merriman, was the "first American recording of a complete opera by RCA Victor."

New Orleans Opera 

In 1954, Cellini was appointed General Director and Conductor of the New Orleans Opera Association, where he debuted with La bohème (staged by Armando Agnini).  While there, he founded The Experimental Opera Theatre of America (1954–60) in association with the New Orleans Opera.  It was "designed to give young singers an opportunity to be heard in opera."  These young singers included Harry Theyard, Mignon Dunn, Norman Treigle, John Reardon, Audrey Schuh, André Turp, Chester Ludgin, John Macurdy, Stanley Kolk, Ara Berberian, Enrico di Giuseppe, Ticho Parly and Benjamin Rayson.

While in New Orleans Cellini conducted performances of many operas, including Otello (with Ramón Vinay and Nelli), Tosca (with Inge Borkh and Robert Weede), Lakmé, Amelia al ballo (with Schuh), Elektra, L'amore dei tre re, Falstaff (with Warren), Werther, La cenerentola, Boris Godunov (with Boris Christoff), Il trovatore, Turandot, Norma, Don Giovanni (with Treigle), Tannhäuser, La Gioconda, Manon (with Phyllis Curtin and Nicolai Gedda), Un ballo in maschera, Orfeo ed Euridice, Der Rosenkavalier, Rigoletto (with Cornell MacNeil) and La forza del destino (with Eileen Farrell and Richard Cassilly).

In 1964, in failing health, Cellini conducted for the last time (Aïda).  He died on March 25, 1967 (Holy Saturday), in New Orleans at the age of 54, and is buried in Metairie Cemetery.  In 2004 his widow, Giuseppina "Pinuccia," moved from New Orleans to Tennessee; she died in 2015.

Studio discography (complete operas) 

 Verdi: Rigoletto (Berger, Merriman, Peerce, Warren, Tajo) RCA Victor 1950
 Verdi: Il trovatore (Milanov, Barbieri, Björling, Warren, Moscona) RCA Victor 1952
 Mascagni: Cavalleria rusticana (Milanov, Roggero, Björling, Merrill) RCA Victor 1953
 Leoncavallo: Pagliacci (de los Ángeles, Björling, Franke, Warren, Merrill) RCA Victor 1953

Approved "live" discography 
 Verdi: Falstaff (della Chiesa, Schuh, Turp, Warren, Torigi; 1956) VAI
 Verdi: La traviata: excerpts (Kirsten, Hayward, MacNeil; 1958) VAI
 Puccini: La bohème (Albanese, Schuh, di Stefano, Valdengo, Treigle; 1959) VAI
 Puccini: Madama Butterfly (Kirsten, Barioni, Torigi; 1960) VAI
 Saint-Saëns: Samson et Dalila (Stevens, Vinay, Berberian; 1960) VAI
 Ponchielli: La Gioconda (Milanov, Kramarich, Gismondo, Bardelli, Wilderman; 1960) VAI
 Verdi: La forza del destino: excerpts (Farrell, Cassilly; 1963) VAI
 Mascagni: Cavalleria rusticana (Milanov, Gismondo, Rayson; 1963) VAI

References
 "Obituary," Opera, May 1967.

External links 
  (with Licia Albanese, Giuseppe di Stefano, Patrice Munsel, and Leonard Warren, 1951, audio only).

1912 births
1967 deaths
Italian male conductors (music)
Italian emigrants to the United States
20th-century Italian conductors (music)
20th-century Italian male musicians